The Metallica By Request Tour was a concert tour by American heavy metal band Metallica in support of their single Lords of Summer, which was released on March 19, 2014. An interactive tour, concertgoers could vote, via internet, which songs Metallica would include on each night's setlist and, at the concert, via SMS, to a song in the encore. Metallica debuted a new song, called "Lords of Summer". Metallica's only stop in North America was in Montreal for the Heavy Montreal festival.

Tour dates

Personnel
James Hetfield – lead vocals, rhythm guitar
Lars Ulrich – drums
Kirk Hammett – lead guitar, backing vocals
Robert Trujillo – bass, backing vocals

References

Metallica concert tours
2014 concert tours